Darwin Ferney Pantoja Tovar (born 25 September 1990) is a Colombian former professional racing cyclist.

Major results
2010
 6th Overall Vuelta al Ecuador
2013
 1st Stage 2 Vuelta al Ecuador

References

External links
 

1990 births
Living people
Colombian male cyclists
Sportspeople from Nariño Department